Kaohsiung 17LIVE Steelers (Chinese: 高雄17直播鋼鐵人) is a professional basketball team based in Kaohsiung, Taiwan. They have been part of the P. League+ since the 2021–22 season. Established in 2021, the team plays in the Fengshan Arena.

On October 13, 2022, the team was renamed to Kaohsiung 17LIVE Steelers.

Facilities

Home arenas

Roster

Season-by-season record

References

External links
  
 

2021 establishments in Taiwan
Basketball teams established in 2021
P. League+ teams
Sport in Kaohsiung